Classroom of the Elite is an anime series adapted from the light novels of the same title written by Shōgo Kinugasa and illustrated by Shunsaku Tomose. The second season was announced on February 21, 2022, with Lerche returning to animate the series. The season is directed by Yoshihito Nishōji, with Kishi and Hashimoto returning as chief directors, Hayato Kazano replacing Akashiro as the scriptwriter, and Morita as the character designer. Masaru Yokoyama and Kana Hashiguchi are composing the music, replacing Takahashi. The opening theme, "Dance in the Game," is performed by ZAQ, and the ending theme, "Hito Jibai," is performed by Mai Fuchigami. The season aired from July 4 to September 26, 2022.


Episode list

Notes

Title's Quotes

References

External links
  
 

2
2022 Japanese television seasons